The NCAA Men's Division II Swimming and Diving Championships are annual college championship events in the United States.

Events
The NCAA Men's Division II Swimming and Diving Championships consist of 14 individual, 5 relay, and 2 diving events.  Three relays and one individual event have been added since the first Championships in 1964.  The 800-yard freestyle relay was introduced in 1966 and the 200-yard freestyle relay and the 200-yard medley relay were both introduced in 1989.  The 1,000-yard freestyle was introduced in 2001 and Division II is the only NCAA division to offer it at their Championships.

Individual swimming events

Freestyle events
50-yard freestyle
100-yard freestyle
200-yard freestyle
500-yard freestyle
1,000-yard freestyle
1,650-yard freestyle

Backstroke events
100-yard backstroke
200-yard Backstroke
Breaststroke events
100-yard breaststroke
200-yard breaststroke

Butterfly events
100-yard butterfly
200-yard butterfly
Medley events
200-yard individual medley
400-yard individual medley

Team swimming events

Team freestyle events
200-yard freestyle relay
400-yard freestyle relay
800-yard freestyle relay

Team medley events
200-yard medley relay
400-yard medley relay

Diving events

Diving events
One-meter diving
Three-meter diving

Champions

Source:

NCAA team titles

Championship records

|-bgcolor=#DDDDDD
|colspan=9|
|-

|-bgcolor=#DDDDDD
|colspan=9|
|-

|-bgcolor=#DDDDDD
|colspan=9|
|-

|-bgcolor=#DDDDDD
|colspan=9|
|-

|-bgcolor=#DDDDDD
|colspan=9|
|-

|-bgcolor=#DDDDDD
|colspan=9|
|-

See also
NCAA Women's Division II Swimming and Diving Championships
NCAA Men's Division I Swimming and Diving Championships
NCAA Men's Division III Swimming and Diving Championships
NAIA Men's Swimming and Diving Championships
List of college swimming and diving teams

References

External links
NCAA Division II Men's Swimming and Diving Page

Swimming And Diving, Men's
Swimming competitions in the United States
Recurring sporting events established in 1964